Carlström or Carlstrom is a surname. Notable people with the surname include:

People
John Carlstrom (born 1957), American astrophysicist and Professor at the University of Chicago
Kjell Carlström (born 1976), Finnish road racing cyclist for UCI ProTour team Team Sky
Lennart Carlström, Swedish orienteering competitor
Oscar E. Carlstrom (1878–1948), Illinois Attorney General
Sten-Olof Carlström, Swedish orienteering competitor
Swede Carlstrom (1886–1935), Major League Baseball shortstop
Victor Carlstrom (1890–1917) Swedish-American aviator

Things
Carlstrom Field, named for Lt. Victor Carlstrom, (1890–1917)

de:Carlström
es:Carlstrom
es:Carlström